Nyima County is  the westernmost county-level division under the administration of the prefecture-level city of Nagqu, Tibet Autonomous Region, People's Republic of China. The northern part of the county is within the Changtang area.

It is situated in the central-northern part of the Tibetan Plateau, between Nagqu's Shuanghu County to the east and Ngari's Gêrzê County to the west.

Counties of Tibet
Nagqu